Prentiss House may refer to:

Prentiss-Payson House, Arlington, Massachusetts, listed on the National Register of Historic Places (NRHP)
William Prentiss House, Arlington, Massachusetts, NRHP-listed
Prentis House, Hadley, Massachusetts 
Addison Prentiss House, Worcester, Massachusetts, NRHP-listed
Warren-Prentis Historic District, Detroit, Michigan, NRHP-listed
Frederick Prentiss House, Columbus, OH, listed on the NRHP in Ohio
Prentiss-Tulford House, Columbus, OH, listed on the NRHP in Ohio

See also
 Mary Prentiss Inn, Cambridge, Massachusetts, USA
 Prentiss (disambiguation)